The men's 200 metres was an event at the 1976 Summer Olympics in Montreal. The competition was held on 25 July 1976 and 26 July 1976. There were 45 competitors from 33 nations. The maximum number of athletes per nation had been set at 3 since the 1930 Olympic Congress.

Summary

Starting in lane 2, co-world record holder Don Quarrie of Jamaica was out to the lead from the gun. Only American Millard Hampton was in near contact. Through the turn, Hasely Crawford of Trinidad and Tobago pulled up and eventually limped home almost a minute behind the field. Coming off the turn another American, Dwayne Evans on the outside in lane 7, and future world record holder Italian Pietro Mennea across the track in lane 1, were battling for bronze with Bogdan Grzejszczak of Poland the next pursuer. Quarrie won the gold medal, with Hampton finishing close second. Meanwhile, Evans had the stronger finish to hold off Mennea. The fastest finish of all was by Rui da Silva, who came off the turn in dead last but made up several metres to take fifth.

Quarrie's gold was Jamaica's first medal in the men's 200 metres. The United States extended its podium streak in the event to 10 Games.

Background

This was the 17th appearance of the event, which was not held at the first Olympics in 1896 but has been on the program ever since. One of the eight finalists from the 1972 Games returned: bronze medalist Pietro Mennea of Italy. The favorite was Don Quarrie of Jamaica, who had also been favored four years earlier in Munich but pulled a hamstring in the semifinals. His biggest competitors in 1976 were Steve Williams of the United States, who was out injured, and James Gilkes of Guyana, who was not competing due to the African boycott.

Antigua and Barbuda, the Ivory Coast, Kuwait, and Papua New Guinea each made their debut in the event. The United States made its 17th appearance, the only nation to have competed at each edition of the men's 200 metres to date.

Competition format

The competition used the four round format introduced in 1920: heats, quarterfinals, semifinals, and a final. The "fastest loser" system introduced in 1960 was available but not used this Games due to the distribution of heats making it unnecessary.

There were 8 heats of between 6 and 7 runners each (before withdrawals), with the top 4 men in each advancing to the quarterfinals. The quarterfinals consisted of 4 heats of 8 athletes each; the 4 fastest men in each heat advanced to the semifinals. There were 2 semifinals, each with 8 runners. Again, the top 4 athletes advanced. The final had 8 runners. The races were run on a 400 metre track.

Records

Prior to the competition, the existing world and Olympic records were as follows.

No new world or Olympic records were set during the competition.

Schedule

All times are Eastern Daylight Time (UTC-4)

Results

Heats

Held on July 25, 1976.

Heat 1

Heat 2

Heat 3

Heat 4

Heat 5

Heat 6

Heat 7

Heat 8

Quarterfinals

Held on July 25, 1976.

Quarterfinal 1

Quarterfinal 2

Quarterfinal 3

Quarterfinal 4

Semifinals

Held on July 26, 1976.

Semifinal 1

Semifinal 2

Final

Held on July 26, 1976. The Official Report has Crawford listed as did not finish.

References

1
200 metres at the Olympics
Men's events at the 1976 Summer Olympics